The Akhalkalaki uezd was a county (uezd) of the Tiflis Governorate of the Caucasus Viceroyalty of the Russian Empire, and then of Democratic Republic of Georgia, with its administrative centre in Akhalkalak (present-day Akhalkalaki). The county bordered the Gori uezd to the north, the Borchaly uezd to the east, the Alexandropol uezd of the Erivan Governorate and the Kars and Ardahan okrugs of the Kars Oblast to the south, and the Akhaltsikhe uezd to the west. The area of the county roughly corresponded to the contemporary Samtskhe–Javakheti region of Georgia.

History 
The territory of the Akhalkalaki uezd, then part of the Akhaltsikhe uezd, entered into the Kutais Governorate of the Russian Empire following the Russo-Turkish War of 1828. By 1874, the Akhkalaki uezd was detached from the hitherto larger Akhaltsikhe uezd, becoming a constituent county of the Tiflis Governorate.

Following the Russian Revolution, the Akhalkalaki uezd was incorporated into the short-lived Democratic Republic of Georgia, however, it was strongly disputed by the Democratic Republic of Armenia which also claimed the county on the grounds of history and ethnography.

As a result of the Ottoman occupation of the uezd, of the initial 80,000 Armenians in 1918, 30,000 died whilst the surviving 40,000 still in the district were affected by famine and concubinage.

Lord Curzon during the Paris Peace Conference discussions on the fate of the independent Transcaucasian republics assessed the ethnographic situation in the southwestern uezds of the Tiflis Governorate:On the grounds of nationality, therefore, these districts ought to belong to Armenia, but they command the heart of Georgia strategically, and on the whole it would seem equitable to assign them to Georgia, and give their Armenian inhabitants the option of emigration into the wide territories assigned to the Armenians towards the south-west.

Administrative divisions 
The subcounties (uchastoks) of the Akhalkalaki uezd in 1913 were as follows:

Demographics

Russian Empire Census 
The majority of the population indicated Armenian to be their mother tongue, with significant Tatar, Georgian, and Russian speaking minorities.

Kavkazskiy kalendar 

See also 
 History of the administrative division of Russia

Notes

References

Bibliography 

Caucasus Viceroyalty (1801–1917)
Tiflis Governorate
Uezds of Tiflis Governorate
Modern history of Georgia (country)
1880 establishments in the Russian Empire
States and territories established in 1880
States and territories disestablished in 1918